Katarzyna Bujakiewicz (born 28 September 1972 in Poznań) is a Polish actress. In 2003 she starred in the film An Ancient Tale: When the Sun Was a God under Jerzy Hoffman.

References

1972 births
Actors from Poznań
Polish film actresses
Polish stage actresses
Living people
21st-century Polish actresses
Polish television actresses